Plainville is a city in Rooks County, Kansas, United States.  As of the 2020 census, the population of the city was 1,746.  It was named from its setting upon the plains.

History
Washington Irving Griffin settled along a freight trail in an area known as Paradise Flats in 1877. In order to establish a post office, Griffin completed a US Postal Service application that required the signature of the local Justice of the Peace. While reviewing the application, Justice of the Peace Lambert P. Darland suggested the name "Plainville". Griffin operated the Plainville post office and a small store from his sod house, the first structure in what would become the city of Plainville.

In 1888, Plainville filed for incorporation with 500 residents. Dan E. Miller was elected the first mayor. The first city council consisted of Dr. Volney M. Gray, Murray C. Knox, John Mullin, George Brooks and David E. Mickey.

Union Pacific Railroad established an east–west route through Plainville in August 1888. The train tracks ran parallel to Mill Street, approximately one block to the north. The Train Depot was located on the northwest corner of N First Street and Meridian Street. A Roundhouse was located at N First Street and Madison Street.

Plainville Mill & Elevator Co., (est. 1893) was a major employer and purchaser of locally grown wheat. The original mill was destroyed by fire in 1899 and soon replaced by a larger mill. The flour produced by the mill was of such fine quality, the company won a gold medal at the 1904 World's Fair. The mill was again destroyed by fire in 1950. Plainville Mill & Elevator Co. was located on N First Street between Madison and Meridian Streets.

In 1909, fire devastated the Plainville business district. The fire apparently started in a butcher shop on the south side of Mill Street in the early morning hours. Fire quickly spread to the north side of Mill Street. Seventeen structures were destroyed before the fire was contained. The burned out wooden buildings were replaced with stone and brick structures, many still standing on Mill Street today.

Oil was discovered in Rooks County in 1927. The oil boom brought significant growth to Plainville in the 1940s and 1950s. The Bemis-Shutts oil field in the Saline River valley south of Plainville is one of the largest oil producers in the state of Kansas.

Geography
Plainville is located at  (39.232102, -99.303166) at an elevation of 2,146 feet (654 m). It lies in the Smoky Hills region of the Great Plains on the north side of Paradise Creek, a tributary of the Saline River. Southwest of the city, the creek has been dammed to form a small reservoir, Plainville Township Lake.

Climate
Plainville has a humid continental climate (Köppen Dfa) with hot, humid summers and cold, dry winters. The average yearly temperature in Plainville is 51.9 °F (11 °C), and, on average, the city receives 23.2 inches (589 mm) of precipitation a year. Snowfall averages 23.3 inches (592 mm) per year. On average, January is the coolest month, July is the warmest month, and May is the wettest month. The hottest temperature recorded in Plainville was 114 °F (46 °C) in 1940; the coldest temperature recorded was -29 °F (-34 °C) in 1989.

Demographics

2010 census
As of the census of 2010, there were 1,903 people, 819 households, and 516 families residing in the city. The racial makeup of the city was 98.0% White, 0.2% African American, 0.3% Native American, 0.1% Asian, 0.1% Pacific Islander, 0.5% from other races, and 0.9% from two or more races. Hispanic or Latino of any race were 1.5% of the population.

There were 819 households, of which 29.8% had children under the age of 18 living with them, 49.9% were married couples living together, 8.9% had a female householder with no husband present, 4.2% had a male householder with no wife present, and 37.0% were non-families. 32.8% of all households were made up of individuals, and 16% had someone living alone who was 65 years of age or older. The average household size was 2.28 and the average family size was 2.91.

The median age in the city was 41.5 years. 24.7% of residents were under the age of 18; 6.8% were between the ages of 18 and 24; 22.1% were from 25 to 44; 26.2% were from 45 to 64; and 20.2% were 65 years of age or older. The gender makeup of the city was 47.9% male and 52.1% female.

2000 census
As of the census of 2000, there were 2,029 people, 865 households, and 565 families residing in the city. The racial makeup of the city was 98.42% White, 0.39% African American, 0.39% Native American, 0.20% Asian, and 0.59% from two or more races. Hispanic or Latino of any race were 0.30% of the population.

There were 865 households, out of which 28.0% had children under the age of 18 living with them, 52.9% were married couples living together, 8.6% had a female householder with no husband present, and 34.6% were non-families. 31.3% of all households were made up of individuals, and 18.3% had someone living alone who was 65 years of age or older. The average household size was 2.30 and the average family size was 2.89.

In the city, the population was spread out, with 24.6% under the age of 18, 8.0% from 18 to 24, 23.7% from 25 to 44, 20.2% from 45 to 64, and 23.5% who were 65 years of age or older. The median age was 40 years. For every 100 females, there were 89.4 males. For every 100 females age 18 and over, there were 84.8 males.

As of 2000 the median income for a household in the city was $29,402, and the median income for a family was $35,673. Males had a median income of $29,408 versus $17,245 for females. The per capita income for the city was $15,134. About 7.7% of families and 8.6% of the population were below the poverty line, including 9.8% of those under age 18 and 3.4% of those age 65 or over.

Arts and culture

Points of Interest

 Plainville Township Hall (1914) 
 GAR Memorial (1925)
 Plainville Township Lake dam (1937) 
 Rock Gym (1937) 
 Plainville Junior High School building (1939)  
 Plainville Rural High School (1952)  
 Scout House (1964) 
 Clarence Audburn Gilbert memorial (1966) 
 Veterans Memorial (2016)

Parks and Recreation
Max Malin Memorial Ballpark is a multi-field baseball complex.

Plainville City Park includes a playground, basketball court and swimming pool.

Plainville Township Lake is located a half mile west of town. Fishing, picnics and other outdoor recreation are popular activities.

Rooks County Golf Course is a nine-hole, public course located 5 miles north of Plainville.

Education

Public schools
Plainville is part of Unified School District 270.  The district has two schools.
 Plainville Jr-Sr High School 
 Plainville Elementary School

Plainville High School Cardinals has won the following Kansas State High School championships:
 1980 3A Football 
 1985 3A Football 
 1988 3-2-1A Wrestling 
 1992 3-2-1A Wrestling 
 2012 2A Boys Track & Field
 2013 2A Boys Track & Field 
 2017 2A Boys Track & Field

Private schools
 Sacred Heart Grade School

Library
Plainville Memorial Library is a public library serving the community since 1902.

Media

Newspaper
Plainville has one weekly newspaper, Plainville Times.

Radio Station
Radio station KFIX is licensed to Plainville, but broadcasts from Hays, Kansas playing a Classic rock format.

Infrastructure

Transportation
U.S. Route 183 runs north–south through Plainville, intersecting highway K-18 on the north end of town.

Rooks County Regional Airport is located seven miles north of Plainville.

Healthcare
Rooks County Health Center is located on the north end of Plainville.

Notable people
Notable individuals who were born in and/or have lived in Plainville include:
 Rob Beckley (1975-), Christian Artist 
 Brent Collins (1941-1988), Actor 
 Dale Dodrill (1926-2019), NFL Player
 Jack Hartman (1925-1998), Basketball Coach 
 Jerry Moran (1954- ), U.S. Senator
 Carl Weeks (1876-1962), Entrepreneur and Philanthropist

Gallery

References

Further reading

External links

 City of Plainville
 Plainville - Directory of Public Officials, League of Kansas Municipalities
 Historic Images of Plainville, Wichita State University Library
 Plainville city map, KDOT

Cities in Rooks County, Kansas
Cities in Kansas
1888 establishments in Kansas
Populated places established in 1888